Romania does not allow same-sex marriage or civil unions. In June 2018, the European Court of Justice ruled that under certain circumstances same-sex spouses of European Union citizens should be granted a right of residency in Romania. The Constitution of Romania does not define marriage directly, but Article 48 of the Constitution defines marriages between "spouses" as the foundation of the family.

Background
The primary LGBT advocacy group in Romania is ACCEPT, which advocates for partnership rights and same-sex marriage in Romania. The organisation launched a campaign to legalise same-sex registered partnerships in Romania during Bucharest Pride in 2006, which lasted from 30 May to 4 June, and was organised under the theme "Same-sex marriage and civil unions in Romania". This event provoked widespread debate over the issue in the media. ACCEPT activists organised a public debate and seminar on same-sex partnerships on 31 May 2006, and called on the Government of Romania to legalise same-sex marriage or registered partnerships, offering its assistance in drafting a legislative proposal. Romaniţa Iordache, the executive director of ACCEPT, said on 31 May 2006 that "Article 200 [the last anti-gay law] has been abrogated, but we [the LGBT community] still do not have equal rights, even though the Constitution guarantees this." A spokesman for ACCEPT, Florin Buhuceanu, claimed that "guaranteeing the equality of rights through the recognition of gay marriage... is just a step forward."

Romania's first religious same-sex marriage ceremony was performed on 5 June 2006 following Bucharest Pride, when Florin Buhuceanu married his Spanish partner of four years. The symbolic marriage, which has no legal status in Romania, was blessed by the Metropolitan Community Church in Bucharest, an international denomination which recognises same-sex unions and supports LGBT rights. The couple officially married later in 2006 in a civil marriage in Spain, where same-sex marriage is legal.

Health-related rights
In June 2019, the Chamber of Deputies voted in favour of amending patient rights legislation, allowing patients to designate any person over 18 years of age as their "legal representative" through a statutory declaration. This allows a person in a same-sex relationships to visit their partner in hospital and to make medical decisions on their behalf. The initiator of the law specifically referred to the fact that 10% of Romanian couples are unmarried as one of the reasons for the reform. The law was promulgated by President Klaus Iohannis on 24 July 2019 and came into effect on 28 July 2019. While the law does not specifically mention same-sex couples, it provides a mechanism for same-sex couples to obtain equal visitation and medical decision-making rights to different-sex married couples, by appointing themselves as a "legal representative" through a public notary.

Registered partnerships
Registered partnerships have not been legislated for in Romania, despite several failed attempts in the past.

Background
On 23 February 2008, Péter Eckstein-Kovács, a parliamentarian from the Democratic Union of Hungarians in Romania, proposed a bill to legalise registered partnerships, providing unmarried same-sex and opposite-sex couples a number of legal rights and benefits. He said that the current Family Code was "adopted more than fifty years ago and no longer reflected social realities, both in the case of homosexuals and heterosexuals". This marked the first time in Romania that a politician had explicitly supported registered partnerships for same-sex couples. The bill failed to pass. Eckstein-Kovács re-introduced a partnership bill on 23 July 2008. However, that bill died in the Senate following the 2008 election.

A registered partnership bill was introduced by Viorel Arion from the Democratic Liberal Party in February 2011. It would have provided same-sex and opposite-sex couples with some of the rights of marriage. It received a favourable recommendation from the Legislative Committee of the Chamber of Deputies. However, the bill was opposed by the government, and ultimately failed to pass.

Green Party bills
In April 2013, MP Remus Cernea from the Green Party announced he would introduce a bill to grant same-sex couples the same rights as opposite-sex couples, prompting fierce reactions from opponents of the move. Among the most vehement reactions was from Senator Puiu Hașotti, who described homosexuals as "sick people" and "not natural", prompting a formal complaint by the organization ACCEPT to the National Council for Combating Discrimination. On 4 July 2013, Cernea introduced the bill to the Senate. A few months later, the Romanian Government issued a statement confirming it would not support the bill, and on 17 December 2013 the bill was rejected by the Senate by 110 votes to 2. On 13 March 2014, a judicial committee unanimously advised the Parliament to reject the proposal. On 11 June 2014, the bill was rejected by the Chamber of Deputies with 298 votes opposed to the bill, 4 in favor and 5 abstentions.

On 31 March 2015, another civil union bill was rejected by the Senate with 49 votes against the bill, 8 in favor and 3 abstentions.

Reform attempts in 2018–2019
In April 2018, Liviu Dragnea, the President of the Chamber of Deputies, expressed his support for registered partnerships. On 9 October 2018, just days after the failed referendum to ban same-sex marriage in the Romanian Constitution, the Minister for European Affairs, Victor Negrescu, said that a bill allowing registered partnerships had been finalized and would be introduced in mid-October. However, in mid-October 2018, some media reported that the introduction of the bill had been postponed, and that the ruling Social Democratic Party (PSD) and Dragnea himself were no longer supportive. On 29 October, the Senate rejected a partnership bill introduced by Oana Bîzgan, an independent. On 31 October, a group of 42 deputies from different parties submitted another bill to the Chamber of Deputies.

Two separate civil union bills were rejected by the Senate in March 2019. One bill would have recognised same-sex and opposite-sex couples "for the purpose of setting up a shared private life and household", while the other bill would have granted shared rights for couples entering a partnership and covered aspects such as succession rights, protection from domestic violence, the obligation to support an incapacitated partner, and fiscal facilities or social benefits granted by the state.

2018 European Court of Justice ruling

In 2018, the European Court of Justice (ECJ) ruled in favour of a Romanian man, Adrian Coman, who sought to have his marriage to his American husband Clai Hamilton recognised. The couple had married in Belgium in 2010, where same-sex marriage has been legal since 2003. European Union (EU) law permits a non-EU spouse of an EU citizen to join their spouse in the member state where the European national resides. However, Romanian authorities refused to issue a residence permit to Hamilton, arguing that he could not be recognised as Coman's spouse because Romanian law prohibits same-sex marriages. The couple filed suit, arguing that the refusal discriminated on the basis of sexual orientation, which is banned in Romania.

The Romanian Constitutional Court heard the case in 2016 and later decided to consult the ECJ on the matter. The ECJ began examining the case in November 2017. In January 2018, Advocate General Melchior Wathelet advised the court to rule in favour of the couple:

Opinions of the Advocate General are not legally binding but are normally followed by the court. The ECJ found in the couple's favour on 5 June 2018, ruling that EU member states may choose whether or not to allow same-sex marriage, but they cannot obstruct the freedom of residence of an EU citizen and their spouse. The court also ruled that the term "spouse" is gender-neutral, and that it does not necessarily imply a person of the opposite sex. Coman welcomed the ruling, saying: "We can now look in the eyes of any public official in Romania and across the EU with certainty that our relationship is equally valuable and equally relevant for the purpose of free movement within the EU." White & Case, the law firm which represented the couple, and the International Lesbian, Gay, Bisexual, Trans and Intersex Association (ILGA) welcomned the court ruling, but it drew criticism from religious and conservative groups. The Romanian Orthodox Church called the ruling "anti-democratic".

On 18 July 2018, the Romanian Constitutional Court ruled that the state must grant residency rights to the same-sex partners of EU citizens. This followed an attempt for recognition by Coman and Hamilton following the ECJ ruling the previous month. In March 2021, it was reported that Romania has yet to issue a residence permit to Hamilton.

Same-sex marriage
While running for president in 2004, Traian Băsescu said that he saw "nothing wrong" with same-sex marriage. The opposition Social Democratic Party later used his comments against him during the presidential campaign. Băsescu would serve as president from 2004 to 2014.

A lesbian couple was able to marry at Bucharest City Hall in September 2022 because one of the spouses was transgender and had not completed a legal gender change.

Statutory ban
On 13 February 2008, the Senate voted in favour of an amendment to the Civil Code of Romania, proposed by the Greater Romania Party, to explicitly define marriage as being only between "a man and a woman". Previously, the law had only used the words "between spouses". The amendment was approved with 38 votes for, 10 votes against and 19 senators abstaining. It was not voted on by the Chamber of Deputies, and as new elections took place at the end of that year, the legislation died.

In May 2009, a new civil code was proposed by the government. The parliamentary subcommittee responsible for drafting the Civil Code amended the definition of marriage, stating explicitly that it must be "between a man and a woman". An amendment was also passed stating that the Romanian state would not recognise foreign same-sex marriages. Article 259(1) of the Civil Code states that marriage is "the freely consented union between one man and one woman". In addition, Article 277(1) of the code emphasizes that "marriage shall be prohibited between persons of the same sex".

Attempts to amend the Constitution
Article 48 of the Constitution of Romania states:

Amending the Romanian Constitution requires approval by the people through a referendum. Until 2014, referendums required a 50% voter turnout to be valid, but changes to electoral law subsequently reduced this to 30%.

June 2013 attempts
On 5 June 2013, a parliamentary committee tasked with reviewing the Constitution voted to include sexual orientation as a protected ground against discrimination. The same committee voted, the following day, to change the text on marriage from "the family is founded on the freely consented marriage of the spouses" to "the family is founded on the freely consented marriage between a man and a woman alone", thus banning same-sex marriage. Green MP Remus Cernea described the move to ban same-sex marriage as "clearly a democratic setback; Romania should now be included among the most homophobic countries in the world." Many NGOs opposed the move to ban same-sex marriage and released a common statement arguing that the provision prohibiting discrimination based on sexual orientation should remain in the Constitution. Florin Buhuceanu, the executive director of ACCEPT, said: "We see the scale of schizophrenia: one day you accept sexual orientation as a constitutional protected ground [against discrimination], the next day you act discriminately on the basis of sexual orientation proposing a different treatment for these citizens of Romania of this sexual orientation." Csaba Ferenc Asztalos, president of the National Council for Combating Discrimination, thought that the new amendments "are brought to the table just to manipulate, just to incite, just to serve other goals then a real problem (...) [and] that at this point we are channeling the societal hatred through acts like the Constitution only, for example, to have [political] quorum (...) and this is not normal".

Faced with backlash from civil society and domestic and international organizations, the committee retracted both amendments. Save Romania Union was the only party with parliamentary representation that positioned itself against a potential referendum to amend the constitutional definition of the family and ban same-sex marriage in Romania.

2018 referendum

The Romanian Government announced plans to hold a referendum in the fall of 2017, following a successful citizens' initiative by a group opposed to same-sex marriage, the Coaliția pentru Familie, which collected an estimated 3 million signatures in support of banning same-sex marriage. The Chamber of Deputies approved the initiative on 9 May 2017 in a 232–22 vote. However, no referendum was held that year. The government proposed to hold the referendum in May or June 2018, though these months also passed without a vote. Eventually, the referendum was confirmed to be held on 6 and 7 October 2018. The referendum proceeded as planned on 6 and 7 October, and cost an estimated €43 million. It failed to achieve validity as the turnout was 21.1%, well below the 30% required under the law. The lowest turnout (8.5%) was recorded in Covasna County. The highest turnout (30.7%) was in Suceava County, the only county to surpass the 30% threshold.

2018 Constitutional Court ruling
On 27 September 2018, less than two weeks before the referendum to ban same-sex marriage, the Constitutional Court of Romania ruled that same-sex couples have the same rights to privacy and family life as heterosexual couples. The ruling, hailed as "landmark" by LGBT advocacy groups, stated that legal rights and obligations should be equal under law. However, the court also ruled that the term "spouses" can only refer to a "man and woman", since this was the intention of the original constitutional lawmakers.

Political viewpoints
With the exceptions of Save Romania Union and the Green Party, none of Romania's major political parties, either in government or in opposition, explicitly support same-sex marriage or registered partnerships, or have proposed any law regarding it, resulting in the debate about this issue in the political sphere being more reserved than in civil society and the media.

On 6 June 2006, the Cotidianul newspaper conducted interviews with representatives of the five main political parties, asking them about their stance on same-sex marriage. Crin Antonescu, the leader of the parliamentary delegation of the National Liberal Party, part of the governing coalition, declined to give an official party view on the matter. Instead, he said that "both the party and myself have given proof that we are in favour of recognising sexual minorities. However, personally I am against marriage between people of the same sex." The leader of the Democratic Party, also part of the governing coalition, was similarly elusive, stating that: "Now is not the right moment to talk about this issue [same-sex marriage]. We now have other much more important things to do regarding European integration. Let's integrate firstly, and then we can see the way in which mentalities change. Eventually, we will discuss this issue then." Romania's EU accession took place in January 2007. Liviu Negoiţă, the mayor of Sector 3 in Bucharest, said that "if a law will exist [legalising same-sex marriage], I will respect it. As a mayor, I don't have any other choice. Personally, I respect the sexual choice of each person". The largest opposition party, the Social Democrats, whose stance on social issues is usually more conservative than that of the then-governing parties, stated that they would "not initiate and would not support such a legislative proposal". However, the party's official spokesperson also proclaimed that, "a public debate [on same-sex marriage] is necessary, in order to see in what way the standards regarding fundamental liberties can be improved in regard to people with another sexual orientation".

Opposition was seen most clearly from the far-right, nationalist Greater Romania Party. The vice-president of the party stated that "clearly, we wouldn't initiate such a legislative proposal, since we're a Christian party. The sin of sodomy is one of the biggest [sins]." The Conservative Party was less vocal in its opposition to same-sex marriage, with Octavian Petrovici, the vice-president of the party's Bucharest division, stating about same-sex couples that "it's their own choice, and in the same way that we respect the option of every citizen, we respect the choice of these people. However, it is a long way from respecting a choice to making special laws, which do not match the values and principles that our party affirms." On 27 November 2006, the women's wing of the Conservative Party adopted a resolution opposing same-sex marriage and adoption by same-sex couples. The resolution declared that "the family has as its primary aim our continuity and we will continue to support its development, particularly since we will be confronted in the future with an accentuated process of aging and a significant reduction in the population. We reject categorically the legalisation of same-sex marriage." On 10 June 2007, after Bucharest Pride, the Conservative Party reiterated its position on same-sex marriage, stating: "The sexual options of each citizen are accepted and respected in Romania, but from here until the adoption of special laws for sexual minorities is too long a way. We support the definition of marriage as a union between one man and one woman."

Public opinion
The 2015 Eurobarometer found that 21% of Romanians supported same-sex marriage. This represented a 10% increase from 2006. Support across the European Union was 61%.

According to a 2017 Pew Research Center poll, 26% of Romanians supported same-sex marriage, while 74% were opposed. Opposition was 66% among 18–34-year-olds. An IRES (Institutul Roman pentru Evaluare si Strategie) poll conducted in December 2018 found that 27% of Romanians supported same-sex marriage, while 72% were opposed and 1% were undecided or did not answer. In addition, 38% of Romanians supported registered partnerships, while 60% were opposed and 2% were undecided or did not answer.

The 2019 Eurobarometer found that 29% of Romanians thought same-sex marriage should be allowed throughout Europe, while 63% were against.

An ACCEPT 2021 study, carried out by telephone questionnaires on 1,064 people aged 18 years old and over, showed that 43% of respondents supported reforms to allow either civil unions or same-sex marriage. This figure was twice what had been reported in 2016. Of those questioned, 68% said that same-sex families should be protected by the law in Romania like all other families. The majority of those that expressed support for allowing same-sex marriage also supported allowing same-sex couples to raise children.

See also 
LGBT rights in Romania
Recognition of same-sex unions in Europe

Notes

References

Same-sex marriage
Romania
Marriage, unions and partnerships in Romania